Ricardo Mello was the defending champion and he reached the final, but he lost to Dominik Meffert 4–6, 7–6(3), 2–6.

Seeds

Draw

Finals

Top half

Bottom half

References
Main Draw
Qualifying Singles

Brazil Open Series - Singles